Dagfinn Arthur Næss (8 January 1934 – 5 July 2008) was a Norwegian boxer.

He was born in Bergen. He took nine individual national championships between 1953 and 1966, representing the club Bergen-Sparta. His classes were lightweight and light welterweight. At the 1960 Summer Olympics he finished in tied ninth place. He was an honorary member of the Norwegian Boxing Federation.

He died in 2008.

References

1934 births
2008 deaths
Boxers at the 1960 Summer Olympics
Olympic boxers of Norway
Norwegian male boxers
Lightweight boxers
Sportspeople from Bergen
20th-century Norwegian people